Daisy United Methodist Church, is a historic African American Church located at 2685 Daisy Road in Woodbine, Maryland. The building was constructed in 1890.

See also
List of Howard County properties in the Maryland Historical Trust
Asbury Methodist Episcopal Church (Annapolis Junction, Maryland)
Brown Chapel United Methodist Church
First Baptist Church of Elkridge
Hopkins United Methodist Church
Locust United Methodist Church
Mt. Moriah Lodge No. 7
St. Stephens African Methodist Episcopal Church
St. Luke's African Methodist Episcopal Church

References

African-American history of Howard County, Maryland
Howard County, Maryland landmarks
Ellicott City, Maryland
Churches completed in 1890